Annelore Zinke (born 10 December 1958 in Lauchhammer, Bezirk Cottbus) is a German gymnast who competed for the SC Dynamo Berlin / Sportvereinigung (SV) Dynamo. She won many international competitions.

References

External links 
 

1958 births
Living people
People from Lauchhammer
People from Bezirk Cottbus
Socialist Unity Party of Germany members
German female artistic gymnasts
Sportspeople from Brandenburg
20th-century German women
21st-century German women
Medalists at the World Artistic Gymnastics Championships
World champion gymnasts
Recipients of the Patriotic Order of Merit in bronze